Cooling is an English surname. One origin of the name is as a variant of the surname Culling. The other origin is as a name given to people from Cooling, Kent. Notable people with the surname include:

Joyce Cooling, American jazz guitarist, vocalist and songwriter
Robert Cooling, Royal Navy officer
Roy Cooling (1921–2003), English footballer

References

See also
 Cool (surname)
 Cools (surname)
 McCool (surname)

English-language surnames
English toponymic surnames